Petra Kvitová defeated Victoria Azarenka in the final, 7–5, 4–6, 6–3 to win the singles tennis title at the 2011 WTA Tour Championships. She was making her Tour Finals debut.

Kim Clijsters was the reigning champion, but did not qualify this year due to an ongoing abdominal injury.

In addition to Kvitová, Li Na made her debut in the event. Agnieszka Radwańska made her debut as a direct qualifier, after playing as an alternate in 2008 and 2009.

Players

Alternates

Draw

Finals

Red group
Standings are determined by: 1. number of wins; 2. number of matches; 3. in two-players-ties, head-to-head records; 4. in three-players-ties, percentage of sets won, or of games won; 5. steering-committee decision.

White group
Standings are determined by: 1. number of wins; 2. number of matches; 3. in two-players-ties, head-to-head records; 4. in three-players-ties, percentage of sets won, or of games won; 5. steering-committee decision.

See also
WTA Tour Championships appearances

References
Draw

Singles 2011
WTA Tour Championships